Alfred Howitt may refer to:
 Alfred William Howitt (1830–1908), Australian anthropologist and naturalist
 Alfred Bakewell Howitt (1879–1954), English Conservative Party politician, Member of Parliament 1931–1945